The Cotter water tower is a historic elevated steel water tower located in Cotter, Arkansas. It was constructed in 1935 by the Pittsburgh-Des Moines Steel Company, as part of the development of the local water supply system by the Public Works Administration. The tower was added to the National Register of Historic Places in 2007, as part of a multiple-property listing that included numerous other PWA-era projects in Arkansas, under the heading “An Ambition to Be Preferred: New Deal Recovery Efforts and Architecture in Arkansas, 1933-1943.”

See also
Cotton Plant water tower
Hampton Waterworks
Mineral Springs Waterworks
National Register of Historic Places listings in Baxter County, Arkansas
Waldo Water Tower (Waldo, Arkansas)

References

External links
An Ambition to be Preferred: New Deal Recovery Efforts and Architecture in Arkansas, 1933-1943, By Holly Hope

Infrastructure completed in 1935
Towers completed in 1935
Water towers on the National Register of Historic Places in Arkansas
Public Works Administration in Arkansas
National Register of Historic Places in Baxter County, Arkansas
1935 establishments in Arkansas